de Bray may refer to:

People
Salomon de Bray, Dutch artist
Jan de Bray, his son

Places
Pays de Bray, area in northern France

See also
Bray (disambiguation)
Bray (surname)